Galium ehrenbergii is a species of flowering plant in the Rubiaceae family. It was first described by Pierre Edmond Boissier. In 1884, Henry Baker Tristram found G. ehrenbergii in Jisr el Hajar, Lebanon. It is also found in Syria.

References

ehrenbergii
Flora of Lebanon and Syria
Taxa named by Pierre Edmond Boissier